Heerman Witmont (1605 – 1684), was a Dutch Golden Age painter.

Biography
He was born in Delft. According to the RKD he became a member of the Delft Guild of St. Luke in 1644. He is known for detailed "pen paintings" of ships, a grisaille art form whereby the 17th century painter used a pen and gray paint to create a work on a panel prepared with white oil paint.
He died in Delft.

References

Heerman Witmont on Artnet

External links
 

1605 births
1684 deaths
Dutch Golden Age painters
Dutch male painters
Painters from Delft
Artists from Delft